Solveig Hellquist (born January 31, 1949 in Björna, Örnsköldsvik, Västernorrland County), is a Swedish Liberal People's Party politician, member of the Riksdag 2002–2010.

External links
Solveig Hellquist at the Riksdag website

1949 births
Living people
People from Örnsköldsvik Municipality
Members of the Riksdag from the Liberals (Sweden)
Women members of the Riksdag
Members of the Riksdag 2002–2006
Members of the Riksdag 2006–2010
21st-century Swedish women politicians